Billy Sheridan may refer to:

Billy Sheridan, DJ on WSAN and WEEX
Billy Sheridan (wrestling coach), see Gerald Leeman

See also
Bill Sheridan, American football coach
William Sheridan (disambiguation)